Jakub Čech may refer to:
 Jakub Čech (ice hockey)
 Jakub Čech (journalist)